Arriërveld is a hamlet in the Dutch province of Overijssel. It is a part of the municipality of Ommen, and lies about 18 km (11 mi) south of Hoogeveen.

It was first mentioned in 1867 as Arriën Veld, and means field near Arriën. The postal authorities have placed it under Arriën.

References

Populated places in Overijssel
Ommen